The Central Civil Services (CCS) is part of Civil Services of India and are concerned directly with the union non-political executive administration and is the permanent Executive body of the federal Government of India. Most of the specialized fields in civil services in India belong to the central services. 

The highest personnel cadre strength among CCS is with Central Secretariat Service and Indian Revenue Service (IT and C&CE). The Ministry of Personnel, Public Grievances and Pensions is the cadre controlling authority for the Central Secretariat Service, while the rest in CCS is controlled by respective Union Government ministries of India. The Central Civil Services are classified into Group A and Group B, both of which are gazetted.

The Government of India approved the formation of a Central Engineering Service cadre Indian Skill Development Service in 2015, Indian Enterprise Development Service. in 2016. Further, the Cabinet of India approved merging 04 railways civil services into a single Indian Railways Management Service as part of a structural reform in the sector in 2019.

History

British India

With the passing of the Government of India Act 1919, the Imperial Services headed by the Secretary of State for India, were split into two – All India Services and Central Services.

The All India  and  Central Services (Group A) were designated as Central Superior Services as early as  1924. From 1924 to 1934, Administration in India consisted of 10 All India Services (including Indian Education Service, Indian Medical Service) and 5 central departments, all under the control of Secretary of State for India, and 3 central departments under joint Provincial and Imperial Control.

The Central Services was headed by the Viceroy and Governor-General of India.

Modern India
The Group A officers are appointed by the President of India and appointments to Group B are made by the authorities specified by a general or special order of the President.

Nature, rules and deputations

Rules and regulations
The Central Civil Services (CCS) is run as per Central Civil Services (Classification, Control and Appeal) Rule and all service members work under restrictions and rules of Central Civil Services (Conduct) Rules. The Indian Railway Services work under Railway Services (Conduct) Rules of 1966.

The Central Civil Services also follows CCS (Commutation of Pension) Rules and has its own Recognition of Service Associations Rules 1993 and Leave Travel Concession Rules 1988.

The University Grants Commission (UGC), in a circular released in October 2018, directed central universities to adopt the Central Civil Services (Conduct) Rules 1964 for professors of the university.

Deputations
The members of Central Civil Services are eligible for deputation to state governments either on personal grounds or official approval from both Government of India aStaffing Scheme of Government of India.

Performance review and dismissal
The employees performance review is conducted under the Fundamental Rule (FR) 56 (J) and 56 (I), and also under Rule 48 (1) (b) of the Central Civil Services (Pension) Rules, 1972, that gives "absolute right" to the appropriate authority to retire a government servant, "if it is necessary to do so in public interest".

A government servant can be retired "in public interest" under Central Civil Services (Classification, Control & Appeal) Rules, 1965, as a penalty for possession of assets disproportionate to known source of income or for accepting gratification as a reward for doing or forbearing to do an official act.

Recruitment
The recruitment of the CCS (Group A) is made through Civil Services Examination, Engineering Services Examination, Combined Geo-Scientist and Geologist Examination, I.E.S./I.S.S. Examination, Combined Medical Services Examination, Central Armed Police Forces of Union Public Service Commission (UPSC). All promotions or empanelment in the CCS are either by Civil Services Board or by Appointments Committee of the Cabinet.

Central Government  Services (Group A)
The Central  Services (Group A) are concerned with the administration of the Union Government. All appointments to Central Civil Services (Group A) are made by the President of India.

Central Government  Services (Group B)
For Group B civil service posts only, the Combined Graduate Level Examination (CGLE) is conducted by the Staff Selection Commission (SSC).
All appointments to Group B are made by the authorities specified by a general or special order of the President.

Reforms and Challenges
In 2016, the Ministry of Finance for the first time, dismissed 72 and prematurely retired another 33 Indian Revenue Service officers for non-performance and on disciplinary grounds. In 2019, Government of India dismissed 12 (IRS IT) and 15 (IRS Customs and Central Excise) officers for corruption and bribery charges. In 2019, Department of Personnel and Training in Ministry of Personnel, Public Grievances and Pensions listed 284 Central Secretariat Service officers for performance audit by review panel headed by Cabinet Secretary of India.

See also
 Civil Services of India
 Special Duty Allowance (SDA)

References

Notes

External links
 CCS (CONDUCT) RULES, 1964, CCS Rules-1964
 Central Secretariat Manual of Office Procedure 14th Edition by Ministry of Personnel, Public Grievances and Pensions

News
 Prime Minister instructs DoPT for speedy empanelment of officers from all central services by The Times of India
 Central Civil Services Pension Rule, 1972: Centre amends 47-year-old provision to widen scope by CNBC

Civil Services of India